Tiga guérisseur  is a 2001 Burkinabé film.

Synopsis 
Tiga is in his thirties and tries out different jobs but finds them to be too exhausting or grubby. He has the idea of becoming a healer. Certain that he will become rich easily, Tiga invents his own magic potions. All goes well until the day a suspicious woman makes him drink his own potion first.

External links 

2001 films
Belgian short films
Burkinabé short films
2001 short films